Daniel Leon Gabbidon (born 8 August 1979) is a Welsh former professional footballer who played as a defender. He played for West Bromwich Albion, Cardiff City (two spells), West Ham United, Queens Park Rangers, Crystal Palace, and Panteg. He also played for the Wales national team.

Club career

West Bromwich Albion
Born in Cwmbran, Wales, Gabbidon began his career at West Bromwich Albion, joining as an apprentice in November 1996 before turning professional in July 1998. He made his Albion début in a 1–0 home defeat against Ipswich Town on 20 March 1999 and, utilised as a right-back, he went on to make 27 appearances for West Brom in all competitions. Following the appointment of Gary Megson as manager towards the end of the 1999–2000 season, Gabbidon failed to keep his place in the team. Megson switched to a 5-3-2 formation, signing Des Lyttle to fill the right-wingback position. Gabbidon joined Cardiff City on a one-month loan at the start of the 2000–01 season.

Cardiff City
Gabbidon signed a permanent four-year deal with Cardiff City in September 2000, for a fee of up to £500,000 depending on appearances and future honours. His performances in the 2001–02 season helped Cardiff to the Division 2 play-offs, saw him make his senior international debut for Wales in March 2002 and win the Welsh clubman of the year award in October 2002. He signed an extension to his contract in April 2002, saying that it was the prospect of exciting times ahead that had persuaded him to do so. A back injury that had troubled him for some years, forced him off the pitch during a match against Barnsley in November 2002 and it was not until April 2003 that he returned to competitive action in a reserve game. He returned to the first-team in time to help Cardiff win promotion to Division 1 through the play-offs in May 2003. He missed several games at the beginning of the 2003–04 season with a heel injury but his assured performances at centre-half, and those of striker Robert Earnshaw, led club chairman, Sam Hammam, to insist in December 2003 that "Our top young players are going nowhere" in the January 2004 transfer window.

Gabbidon went on to earn a place in the First Division team of the year in April 2004. Despite speculation during 2004 that Gabbidon might leave Cardiff City, Gabbidon signed an extension to his contract in September 2004, tying him to the club until 2008. Cardiff were prepared to offer him "...the most lucrative contract ever offered to a Cardiff player", with club owner, Sam Hammam, saying, "I want to make Danny Gabbidon a cornerstone of Cardiff City FC, I see him as the absolute future of this football club personified." The 2004–05 season saw Cardiff embroiled in a relegation battle in the first half of the season, something to which Gabbidon was unaccustomed. An unbeaten run in January 2005 however saw Cardiff lift themselves five points clear of the Championship relegation zone and Gabbidon named the Championship's player of the month. A financial crisis at Cardiff at the end of the season led to Gabbidon being unsure of his future at the club and he was sold to West Ham United in July 2005 to help cut the wage bill. On 4 July 2009, he played in the first ever game at the Cardiff City Stadium, an all-stars match.

West Ham United

Gabbidon moved to West Ham in July 2005, as part of a deal that also took fellow defender James Collins to Upton Park. His performances for his country during the year won him the Welsh Footballer of the Year award in October 2005. He established himself in central defence alongside Anton Ferdinand and helped West Ham to a mid-table position in the Premier League in the 2005–06 season and to the FA Cup final in May 2006, receiving a runners-up medal. After his performances in the 2005–06 season, he was voted 'Hammer of the Year' with Marlon Harewood named as runner-up. Gabbidon had been ever-present as West Ham struggled against relegation in the 2006–07 season, when he suffered a torn hamstring in November 2006, which sidelined him for a month. Groin injuries required surgery in January 2007 and again in April, ruling him out for the rest for the season. West Ham started the 2007–08 season with Anton Ferdinand and Matthew Upson in the centre of defence with Gabbidon as substitute.

He signed a two-year extension to his contract in August 2007, saying, "I am disappointed not to be in the side but at least the new contracts show that the club wants both me and James [Collins] around. We will both now work hard and fight to prove we are worthy of a place in the side." Injuries meant Gabbidon played no football for West Ham from December 2007 until August 2009 when he made his return in the League Cup game against Millwall. Gabbidon is one of a number of Premier League players that use Twitter to communicate with fans. In May 2011 he was fined £6,000 by the Football Association for comments he made on Twitter in April 2011 after West Ham's 2–1 home defeat by Aston Villa. He admitted a charge of improper conduct over the tweet;-
"U know what, f*** the lot of you, u will never get another tweet from me again, you just don't get it do you. Bye bye". Gabbidon was released by West Ham in June 2011.

Queens Park Rangers
On 24 July 2011, Gabbidon signed a one-year contract with Queens Park Rangers (QPR) after impressing on trial with the club. He made his début on 13 August 2011, scoring an own goal in the 4–0 loss to Bolton Wanderers.
On 17 January 2012, Gabbidon scored his first first-team goal since March 2005, a header from a corner in QPR's 1–0 FA Cup third round replay tie win against Milton Keynes Dons. It was his only goal for QPR as following the sacking of manager Neil Warnock. Gabbidon rarely played under new manager Mark Hughes and he was released at the end of the 2011–12 season.

Crystal Palace
On 18 September 2012, Gabbidon signed for Crystal Palace. He did not make his debut until 15 December 2012 coming on in the 77th minute for André Moritz in a 2–2 away draw with Birmingham City. On 20 April 2013, against Leicester City from a Stephen Dobbie free kick, Gabbidon scored his first goal for Palace and his first league goal for eight years in a match that finished in a 2–2 draw. He would only score once more for Palace, in 3–1 home win against Sunderland on 31 August 2013. In May 2014 he was released by Crystal Palace. He had played 38 games in all competitions, scoring twice.

Cardiff City

On 1 September 2014, Gabbidon signed a one-year player/coach contract with Cardiff City. In September 2014 he was appointed as interim manager of the club following the departure of Ole Gunnar Solskjær.  On 5 May 2015, it was announced that Gabbidon would be released at the end of his contract.

Panteg
In August 2015, Gabbidon joined his hometown club, Welsh Football League Division Three side Panteg, where his brother David also played. Gabbidon acted as a player-coach at the club as well as continuing his various media commitments.

International career
Gabbidon was born in Wales to a Jamaican father and a Barbadian mother. Gabbidon had made 17 appearances for the Welsh Under-21 team, when an unexpected call up for the Welsh senior squad in the World Cup qualifier against Belarus in October 2001 prevented him from making his final appearance for the under 21 side. He was an unused substitute in that match and was again called into the senior squad for a friendly game against Argentina in February 2002 but it was not until the next month that he made his debut in a 0–0 home draw against the Czech Republic on 27 March 2002. He became a regular in the team despite a back problem that caused him to miss a large part of the 2002–03 season, and was part of the squad that narrowly missed out on a place at Euro 2004, losing to Russia in the play-offs, and the squad that did not qualify for the 2006 World Cup. Roy Evans, the Wales assistant coach, tipped Gabbidon to be a future captain of the national side, saying, "I see him as potential captain material even if it is not my decision. But he has all the qualities. You do not always have to be vocal, you need to lead by example." Gabbidon captained the side in place of the injured Ryan Giggs in 1–0 away defeat against Cyprus in November 2005 and again in place of Craig Bellamy in a 1–0 win against Bulgaria in August 2007.

In October 2010 Gabbidon announced his retirement from international football.
However, on 6 January 2011, it was revealed that new Wales manager Gary Speed had asked Gabbidon to rethink his decision to retire from international football "He is the type of player I would like to see change his mind, I have left a couple of messages for Danny and I'm sure he'll get back to me in due course" said Speed. Wales & Celtic midfielder Joe Ledley who is also a close friend of Gabbidon, has also called for the West Ham man to return to the international fold. Ledley told his Twitter site: "I think my best mate in football Danny Gabbidon should come out of retirement and play for Wales. We need him."
He was subsequently named in the squad to face the Republic of Ireland in February 2011.

Retirement 
Since retiring from playing Gabbidon now works in the media providing football punditry, he primarily works with BBC Radio Wales where he co-commentates on club matches for the Welsh Football clubs.  He also contributes to a weekly BBC Welsh Football podcast along with comedian Elis James and fellow Welsh International Iwan Roberts.

Career statistics

Club

International

Honours
Cardiff City
Football League Second Division play-offs: 2002–03
Football League First Division PFA Team of the Year: 2003–04

West Ham United
FA Cup runner-up: 2005–06

Crystal Palace
Football League Championship play-offs: 2012–13

Individual
Welsh Footballer of the Year: 2005

Managerial statistics

References

External links

 
 
 4thegame.com
 Premier League profile 
 Wales profile 

1979 births
Living people
Footballers from Cwmbran
Welsh footballers
Wales under-21 international footballers
Wales international footballers
Association football defenders
West Bromwich Albion F.C. players
Cardiff City F.C. players
West Ham United F.C. players
Queens Park Rangers F.C. players
Crystal Palace F.C. players
Premier League players
English Football League players
Welsh football managers
Cardiff City F.C. managers
English Football League managers
Black British sportsmen
Welsh people of Jamaican descent
British sportspeople of Jamaican descent
Welsh people of Barbadian descent
British sportspeople of Barbadian descent
FA Cup Final players
Panteg A.F.C. players